Statistics of 1. deild in the 1985 season.

Overview
It was contested by 8 teams, and B68 Toftir won the championship.

League standings

Results
The schedule consisted of a total of 14 games. Each team played two games against every opponent in no particular order. One of the games was at home and one was away.

Top goalscorers

1. deild seasons
Faroe
Faroe
Football